Hud was a prophet of ancient Arabia mentioned in the Quran. The eleventh chapter of the Quran, Hud,  is named after him, though the narrative of Hud comprises only a small portion of the chapter.

Historical context 

Hud has sometimes been identified with Eber, an ancestor of the Ishmaelites and the Israelites who is mentioned in the Old Testament.

He is said to have been a subject of a mulk (kingdom) named after its founder, 'Ad, a fourth-generation descendant of Noah (his father being Uz, the son of Aram, who was the son of Shem, who in turn was a son of Noah):

The other tribes claimed to be present at this time in Arabia, were the Thamud, Jurhum, Tasam, Jadis, Amim, Midian, Amalek Imlaq, Jasim, Qahtan, Banu Yaqtan and others.

The Quran gives the location of ʿĀd as being Al-Aḥqāf ("The Sandy Plains", or "The Wind-curved Sand-hills"). It is believed to have been in South Arabia, possibly in eastern Yemen and/or western Oman. In November 1991, a settlement was discovered and hypothesized to be Ubar, which is thought to be mentioned in the Qur'an as Iram dhāt al-ʿImād ("Iram of the Pillars" or "Iram of the tentpoles"), and may have been the capital of ʿĀd. One of the members of the original expedition, archeologist Juris Zarins, however, later concluded that the discovery did not represent a city called Ubar. In a 1996 interview on the subject, he said:

The Moroccan mystic Abdulaziz ad-Dabbagh gives detailed information about Hud: According to him,  alludes to the fact that Hud was sent to the second ʿAd tribe, which lived after Noah. The first 'Ad tribe had a messenger named Huwayd, whose message was to be revived by Hud, and the tribe was destroyed with stones and fire by God. Hud was Eber's son (see Eber in Islam for his genealogy) and Iram was the name of one of the tribes of 'Ad, specifically the one Hud was sent to (see Iram in the Qur'an).

Narrative in the Quran 

This is a brief summary of Hud's narrative, with emphasis on two particular verses:

The people of ʿĀd were extremely powerful and wealthy and they built countless buildings and monuments to show their power. However, the ʿĀd people's wealth ultimately proved to be their failure, as they became arrogant and forsook God and began to adopt idols for worship, including three named Samd, Samud and Hara. Hud, even in childhood, remained consistent in prayer to God. It is related through exegesis that Hud's mother, a pious woman who had seen great visions at her son's birth, was the only person who encouraged Hud in his worship. Thus, the Lord raised up Hud as a prophet for the ʿĀd people.

When Hud started preaching and invited them to the worship of only the true God and when he told them to repent for their past sins and ask for mercy and forgiveness, the ʿĀd people began to revile him and wickedly began to mock God's message. Hud's story epitomizes the prophetic cycle common to the early prophets mentioned in the Quran: the prophet is sent to his people to tell them to worship God only and tells them to acknowledge that it is God who is the provider of their blessings The Quran states:

Miracle 
According to a tafsir from Ibn Qayyim al-Jawziyya in his book of analysis, Madaarij Saalikeen, which has been quoted by Ibn Abi al-Izz in his syarh (commentary) of Al-Aqida al-Tahawiyya, Hud has a miracle, which is pointed by the verse of 56-58:

Both Ibn Qayyim and Ibn Abi al-Izz, examining this chain of verses as the occurrence when Hud fought alone against entire nation of 'Ad, the entire city was about to harm him both psychologically and physically, only to be defeated by miraculous power shown by Hud, based on his firm belief of God's protection. Umar Sulaiman Al-Ashqar, a Salafi scholar of Tafsir, quoted this literation in his book, while his brother, Muhammad Sulaiman Al Ashqar, professor of Islamic University of Madinah, also implied his support of this narrative about Hud's miracle, in his own tafsir, Zubdat at Tafsir Min Fath al Qadir. The miracle is further highlighted by Firanda Andirja, lecturer of Al-Masjid al-Haram. According to a tafsir of the whole Surah Hud by scholars, the 'Ad were a powerful empire that preceded the era of Abraham and Nimrod, and they were tyrannically oppressive towards other civilizations at that time.

Calamity upon ʿĀd 
After Hud has been left alone by the people of ʿĀd for a long time. The majority of them, however, refused to pay any notice to his teachings and they kept ignoring and mocking all he said. As their aggression, arrogance and idolatry deepened, God, after plenty of warning, sent a thunderous storm to finish the wicked people of ʿĀd once and for all. The destruction of the ʿĀd is described in the Quran:

Wahbah al-Zuhayli, Salih bin Abdullah al Humaid, Imam of Grand Mosque of Mecca, along with the officials of  Ministry of Islamic Affairs, Dawah and Guidance also agreed the verse were speaking about the punishment from God towards ʿĀd peoples.

Meanwhile, another Quran verse that describe further the characteristic of winds that bear calamity were Adh-Dhariyat:

Exegesis experts translate Ar-Rīḥ al-ʿAqīm literally as "fruitless wind" or "barren wind", a wind that does not bring benefit or any positive reaction to any biological existences. According to Arabic linguists and tafseer experts who examined al-Aqeem, its literal form is "sterile" in this verse's context, which correlates the antithesis of common characteristic of natural winds that usually benefitted the natural cycle, or any biological progressions or reproductions, whether for humans, animals or plants.

In addition for its barren characteristic, another verse also described additional features about the catastrophic tornado which decimated the 'Ad is in Surah Al-Qamar:

Exegesis experts describe ar-Rīḥ ash-Sharshar (the cold and harsh wind) as literally freezing yet possess thunderous deafening voice, and according to Tafsir Ibn Kathir, the strength of such punishing winds alone has squeezed the peoples of Ad inside out, until their intestines came out from their rectum and mouths. Nevertheless, modern contemporary scholars such as Al-Tahawi, Wahbah al-Zuhayli, and other scholars from Islamic University of Madinah and Saudi religious ministry has interpreted the verses of Al-Qamar from 18th verse to the 20th verse were narrating the story about the process of the calamity upon ʿĀd.

In ahadith 
There are several hadiths from various chains that became supporting materials regarding Calamity that has fallen upon the ʿĀd peoples, such as: 
 Abdulaziz al-Tarefe gave commentary in his book, Aqida al Khurasaniyya, regarding Hadith came from Abu Sa'id al-Khudri, where Muhammad has mentioned the threat of Kharijites: From this one’s stock there will be people who recite the Quran, but it will not pass down their throats. They will sever from Islam and leave the worshippers of Idols alone; but if I live up to their time I shall certainly kill them as 'Ad were killed (by Hud). The Hadith has recorded in Al-Nasa'i, Sahih al-Bukhari, Sahih Muslim, and Sunan Abu Dawood, which all graded authentic by Muhammad Nasiruddin al-Albani.
 Another mention of the calamity of 'Ad from Hadith came from the narration of Ibn Abbas and recorded in Sahih al-Bukhari and Sahih Muslim during the battle of the trench, when the polytheists coalition army encampment were struck by storm, that Muhammad as said: "I have been made victorious with As-Saba (easterly wind) and the people of 'Ad were destroyed by Ad-Dabur (westerly wind)."

Place of burial 
Several sites are revered as the tomb of Hud. The most noted site, Qabr Hud, is located in a village in the Hadhramaut, Yemen, and is a place of frequent Muslim pilgrimage. Robert Bertram Serjeant, in his study of the pilgrimage rite to the tomb of Hud, verified on the spot the facts related by Al-Harawi, who described, at the gate of the Mosque, on the west side, the rock onto which Hud climbed to make the call to prayer, and mentioned the grotto of Balhut at the bottom of the ravine. Around the tomb and neighborhood, various ancient ruins and inscriptions have been found. However, as is often the case with the graves of prophets, other locations have been listed. A possible location for his qabr (grave) is said to be near the Zamzam Well in Saudi Arabia, or in the south wall of the Umayyad Mosque in Syria. Some scholars have added that the Masjid has an inscription stating: Haḏā Maqām Hūd ("This is (the) Tomb of Hud"); others, however, suggest that this belief is a local tradition spewing from the reverence the locals have for Hud.

In other religions 
Hud is referred to in the Baháʼí Faith as a Prophet who appeared after Noah and prior to Abraham, who exhorted the people to abandon idolatry and practice monotheism. His endeavors to save His people resulted in their "willful blindness" and His rejection. (The Kitab-i-Iqan, The Book of Certitude, p. 9)

Judaism and Christianity do not venerate Hud as a prophet and, as a figure, he is absent from the Bible. However, there are several pre-Quranic references in Palmyrene inscription to individuals named Hud or possessing a name which is connected to Hud as well as references to the people of ʿĀd. The name Hud also appears in various ancient inscriptions, most commonly in the Hadhramaut region.

See also 
 Biblical narratives and the Quran
 Legends and the Quran
 Muhammad in Islam
 Stories of The Prophets

Citations

Bibliography

References in the Qur'an 

Further reading 
 Qur'anic Tafsir on chapters VII, XI, XXVI (cf. index: Hud)

External links 
 
 نيل المقصود في مشروعية زيارة نبي الله هود عليه السلام (book in Arabic)
 Maqam of Prophet Hud (عليه السلام), Yemen
 View from Prophet Hud's grave (YouTube)

Prophets of the Quran
South Arabia
Iram of the Pillars